Buli, or Kanjaga, is a Gur language of Ghana primarily spoken in the Builsa District, located in the Upper East Region of the country. It is an SVO language and has 200 000 speakers.

The Buli dialects are not well researched and claims about these dialects are therefore inconsistent. One dialect is Chuchuliga, spoken in the northern part of Ghana close to Navrongo. This dialect is influenced by Kasem, which is another Gur language spoken in the Upper East Region of northern Ghana and in Burkina Faso. Chuchuliga has specific morphological features such as the lack of diphthongs, a richer nominal morphology and the lack of low tones, which are similar to other varieties of Buli. According to Ethnologue, Buli does not show dialectal variation and is reportedly similar to Konni, which is spoken in the districts of Nangurima and Yikpabongo. Moreover, Buli is lexically similar with Mampruli (77%).

Phonology

Consonants

Vowels

Tones 
There are three tonal levels in Buli, i.e. high, mid and low, and the tone phenomena are very complex. Words deviate from their basic tonal patterns when they occur in a syntactic schema.

Lexical function

Grammatical function

Grammar

Noun Class System 
There are four singular classes and five plural classes. While the singular class identifiers are not markers of number, the plural markers mark number. This classification is based on semantics rather than morphology. Items in class one are [+human ] and the suffixes do not mark number, but they mostly serve as determiners. The items in all other classes are [-human] and their plural suffixes mark number.

Pronouns

Personal Pronouns/ Possessive Pronouns 
In Buli, there is a distinction between speaker, hearer and topic. The speaker corresponds to the first person, while the hearer is second person. Topic on the other hand refers to the third person, but is treated differently from first and second person in that the third person form corresponds to a nominal class pronoun. In contrast, the first and second person pronouns are formed by a strong or weak person pronoun form. In general, these pronouns show number agreement. Moreover, the topic forms not only express person and number, but also gives rise to the differentiation between the five singular and four plural forms of the noun class system.

There is a distinction between strong and deficient (weak) pronouns which differ in their tonal appearance. The strong forms have a high tone, whereas the deficient forms have a low tone. An overview of the inventory of the personal pronouns in Buli is given in the table below.

Interestingly, for the first and second person pronouns in singular there are three different forms. The pronouns in deficient form mə and fə can only appear in object function, while the pronouns ǹ and fì can only serve as subjects. The pronouns in strong form on the other hand can appear in both subject and object position.

Furthermore, the person pronouns shown in the table above can also be used as possessive pronouns, meaning that they are homonymous. The example below shows that the possessive pronoun can either appear as an independent element or it can be clitically bound with the noun.

Absolute Pronouns 
Pronouns that refer to entities, independent of a verbal predicate, always have to appear in the strong form. In these contexts, there is no possible option of cliticalization, because the focus marker ká as the only preceding element does not obligatorily need to be present. The following examples illustrate this fact.

Reflexive Pronouns 
In order to express reflexivity in Buli, an additional particle dék is used, which can either follow the strong form of a pronoun or it can clitically bind with the deficient form of a pronoun. The strong form is used in order to express logophoric reference, while the deficient form is used in cases, in which the agent and the patient of a predicate are coreferent. An overview of the reflexive pronouns is given in the table below.

Reciprocal Pronouns 
The particle dék expressing reflexivity in a construction with a pronoun can also be used in reciprocal contexts. In order to disambiguate the expression, the reciprocal nominal element chāāb can be used in object position.

Demonstrative Pronouns 
In general, there are two demonstrative pronouns in Buli, dɛ, lá.

Dɛ 
The demonstrative form dɛ is used in contexts, in which an entity to which the pronoun refers to is visible. The form itself can be translated to here. The pronoun is adjoined  to the definite noun as a suffix.

For this demonstrative form there exists also a second more complex form, actually. The basis of the form comes from a noun class pronoun, to which the demonstrative is adjoined as a suffix and the morphem ɲā is optionally prepended. An overview of the demonstrative noun class pronouns formed with dɛ is given below.

Lá 
In contexts, in which the entity to which the demonstrative refers to is not visible, the form lá is used. This demonstrative form is also formed by a noun class pronoun, to which the demonstrative also adjoins as a suffix. This demonstrative can be translated to that. An overview of these forms is given in the table below and an example for a context in which the demonstrative lá is used is given as well. 

The demonstrative can also form a compound with a preceding noun.

Interrogative Pronouns

Which 
The interrogative pronoun for which is formed by the pronoun form of the noun classes with the suffix -nà.

Who 
The singular and plural forms of the first noun class interrogative pronouns (which) are used as the question word for human referents who?. Note that the abbreviation INT denotes interrogativity.

How much/many 
In order to express how much/many, the interrogative form of the second class singular dìnà is used. It can either appear with the focus marker only or preceded by a substantive as antecedent.

The interrogative form can also combine with the strong form of the personal pronouns from the noun classes in order to function as an adnominal quantifier of a preceding noun.

What 
The interrogative form for what is bɔà, which can either form a compound or which modifies a following noun.

How 
The interrogative pronoun for how is sɛ`, that appears in a position preceded by the focus marker ká.

Where 
There are two local question words in Buli, lèē and bɛɛ. The former relates to locations of entities, while the latter is used adverbially.

When 
For the temporal interrogative pronoun there exist several forms in Buli. One form is a compound consisting of the noun tám ("time") and the question word for what. Another and more precise form like "which day/ month/...?" can be formed by the interrogative form for "which" and a noun like "day", as dà-dìnàà. Alternatively, there is a third form dìmpōɔ/dìsàpō, which refers to a more general point in time.

Syntax

Word Order 
Buli has a strict SVO word order with optional focus/wh-movement and no pro-drop. In the following an intransitive clause with an adverb is given, a transitive clause with an adverb and the word order paradigm in an embedded clause. All examples confirm the basic word order of SVO.

Verb Phrase 
The verbal system in Buli is characterized by tonal inflection and relatively simple segmental verb morphology. Most of the verbs have a single segmental basic form, to which either a preverbal or postverbal particle is added and a specific tone in order to mark different aspects, modes, affirmation as well as negation.

Preverbal Particles 
Preverbal particles mainly mark aspect and polarity. Note that the absence of a preverbal particle indicates perfective aspect.

Á,À 
The preverbal particle á, à marks imperfective aspect. In the subjunctive the particle á is used, while its counterpart with low tone à is used in the indicative. In the example below this particle thus occurs in subjunctive or in indicative, respectively.

Lè 
The preverbal particle lè marks future tense. It can either attach to a preceding pronoun or it can occur as an independent particle.

Kán, kàn 
This preverbal particle kán, kàn is a preverbal negative marker. Similarly to the tone pattern of the preverbal particle á, à, in the subjunctive the preverbal particle kán has a high tone on the vowel, while in the indicative it has a low tone kàn.

Postverbal Particles 
Postverbal particles in Buli mainly express affirmation and negation.

Ya 
The postverbal particle yā expresses assertion and is used in cases in which there is no preverbal particle, thus in perfective aspect. In contrast to the preverbal particles, this postverbal particle has to attach to the verb and cannot appear as an independent particle. The following example illustrates that the speaker expresses a particularly surprising aspect of the facts. Moreover, predicates marked with this particle are used by speakers as an unexpected or unforeseeable change of situation, occasionally also adverbially translated as 'just now', 'immediately' or 'suddenly'.

Kámā 
This particle expresses affirmation. Interestingly, the focus marker kà seems to be contained in the morphem ká-, while the morphem -mā seems to be an element with unknown function.1 The emphatic function of this particle is to establish a relation between a truth value of a proposition and an expression from the previous context of the discourse, (i.e. indeed, really). It seems that this particle expresses verum focus, but according to Schwarz (2005) it is an outstanding issue to investigate whether varying positions of the particle in the clause lead to semantic-pragmatic effects.

Là 
The postverbal particle là is formally identical with the demonstrative pronoun lá and also has an emphatic function. In Schwarz (2005), the use of this particle is described as the use of emphasis on the subject, which is characterized to a particular degree by the facts predicated on it as standing out from the crowd of potential alternatives. In the examples below this particle stresses the property of being late and having a big nose.

Negation 
Negation in Buli is expressed by two negative markers, one occurs preverbally and the other one postverbally. The first example below illustrates negation in the perfective, while the second example illustrates negation in the imperfective. In both examples, there is a preverbal negative marker and a postverbal one, similar to other negation systems like in French ne ... pas.

Preverbal negative markers 
The following table gives an overview of the preverbal negative markers, that appear between the subject and the negated verb. The negative markers for the imperative II and the future tense differ only in tones, such that in the imperative II the tone on the vowel is low and the tone on the end is high, while in the future tense it is the exact opposite. The form of the indicative II is the form that deviates the most from the other forms. According to Schwarz (1999), the negative marker àn is associated with a verb in the perfective aspect, while the negative marker kàn is associated with imperfective aspect.

Postverbal negative markers 
Contrary to preverbal negative markers, it is not obligatory for postverbal negative markers to show up. These rather stress the negated clause.

Postverbal Glottal Stop 
All negated predicates in Buli have a hart glottal stop at the end of the clause. This glottal stop stresses the negation at the end of the clause and thus functions as a second negative marker. Note that this glottal stop is not always included in the glossing.

(Y)ā 
For reasons of completeness, the postverbal negative marker (y)ā is listed here as well.

Questions

Ex situ 
Questions that exhibit the question word ex situ are formed by the order QVO, in which the particle ká can optionally precede the question word. Note that this particle is homonymous with the focus marker ká. In subject questions the particle ālì obligatorily follows the subject wh-phrase, whereas in non-subject questions the particle ātì immediately follows the non-subject wh-phrase.

In situ 
In questions, in which the question word occurs in situ, the particle ká obligatorily precedes the question word or the phrase containing the question word, respectively.

Embedded 
In embedded questions the question word remains in situ and is embedded via the complementizer āsī, which only occurs in embedded contexts. In declarative contexts the complementizer āyīn is used.

Multiple Questions 
In ex situ, in situ and embedded questions it is possible to have more than one question word. In multiple questions, the particle ká precedes the highest wh-containing phrase.

Further reading 
 Kröger, Franz. Buli-English dictionary: with an introductory grammar and an index English-Buli (Forschungen zu Sprachen und Kulturen Afrikas, Bd. 1). Münster: Lit, 1992.
 Schott, Rüdiger (1977). "Sources for a History of the Bulsa in Northern Ghana". Paideuma: Mitteilungen zur Kulturkunde, Bd. 23 (1977), pp. 141–168.

References

External links 
 WALS
 Web version of Ethnologue
 The VP-periphery in Mabia languages

Oti–Volta languages
Languages of Ghana